is a Japanese football player. He plays for Vanraure Hachinohe.

Career
Yoshiki Oka joined J2 League club Matsumoto Yamaga FC in 2017.

Club statistics
Updated to 22 February 2020.

References

External links
Profile at Azul Claro Numazu

1994 births
Living people
Momoyama Gakuin University alumni
Association football people from Osaka Prefecture
Japanese footballers
J2 League players
J3 League players
Matsumoto Yamaga FC players
Azul Claro Numazu players
AC Nagano Parceiro players
Vanraure Hachinohe players
Association football forwards